Nyukhcha is a rural locality (a village) in Nyukhchenskoye Rural Settlement of Pinezhsky District, Arkhangelsk Oblast, Russia. The population was 163 as of 2010. There are 4 streets.

Geography 
Nyukhcha is located on the Nyukhcha River, 150 km southeast of Karpogory (the district's administrative centre) by road. Zanyukhcha is the nearest rural locality.

References 

Rural localities in Pinezhsky District
Pinezhsky Uyezd